Libycosaurus ("Lizard of Libya")  was one of the last anthracothere genera.   It lived from the Middle to the Late Miocene, and ranged throughout Central and Northern Africa, and in Uganda, in what was then a lush, marshy environment.

References

Anthracotheres
Miocene even-toed ungulates
Miocene mammals of Africa
Fossil taxa described in 1947
Prehistoric even-toed ungulate genera